Kenneth George Jr. (born  1986) is an American former college basketball player.

College career
George played for the UNC Asheville Bulldogs from 2006 to 2008. He was selected as the Big South Conference Defensive Player of the Year and earned second-team all-Big South honors in 2008.

Career statistics

College

|-
| style="text-align:left;"| 2006–07
| style="text-align:left;"| UNC Asheville
| 23|| 0|| 10.5 || .772|| .000|| .235 || 3.5 || 0.5 || 0.0 || 2.0 || 5.5
|-
| style="text-align:left;"| 2007–08
| style="text-align:left;"| UNC Asheville
| 28 || 0 || 19.8 || .696 || .000 || .652 || 7.0 || 1.1 || 0.1 || 3.3 || 12.4
|-
| align="center" colspan="2"| Career
| 51 || 0 || 15.2 || .734 || .000 || .460 || 5.3 || 0.8 || 0.0 || 2.7 || 9.0
|-

Personal life 
Kenny George is from Chicago, Illinois. In October 2008, George had his right foot partly amputated due to a Methicillin-resistant Staphylococcus aureus (MRSA) infection.

References

External links
The Tallest Man: Kenny George
MSNBC News Story

1980s births
Living people
African-American basketball players
American amputees
Basketball players from Chicago
Centers (basketball)
Latin School of Chicago alumni
People with gigantism
UNC Asheville Bulldogs men's basketball players
University of North Carolina at Asheville alumni
American men's basketball players
Year of birth missing (living people)
21st-century African-American sportspeople
20th-century African-American people